Junior G-Men is a 1940 Universal film serial.  It was Universal's 116th serial (and the 48th with sound) of their total of output of 137.  The serial is one of the three serials starring "The Dead End Kids and Little Tough Guys" who were under contract to Universal at the time.  The plot of Junior G-Men is a pre-World War II G-Man story about fifth columnists in the United States, with the FBI joining forces with youth to save the country.

Plot
A group of saboteurs called the "Order of the Flaming Torch" who are trying to undermine the "social order" of the United States kidnaps several prominent scientists, including Colonel Robert Barton, the father of Billy Barton, the leader of a group  of young local street toughs.

When FBI Agent Jim Bradford investigates the mysterious disappearances, Billy is reluctant to help the authorities. Billy's gang team up with the FBI and the youthful "Junior G-Men", led by Harry Trent in order to stop the saboteurs.

The criminal gang led by a man called Brand, calls themselves "The Order of the Flaming Torch". They are intent on destroying important military programs. The enemy agents become aware that they boys are on their trail and set a trap. When Billy and Harry are captured, they find a way to signal to their friends, and are rescued.

"The Order of the Flaming Torch" is after the inventor of a new aerial torpedo. Billy and Harry go to the local airfield and hide on one of the inventor's aircraft. When the pilot is knocked out by one of Brand's men, the boys struggle to regain control of the aircraft. Finally successful, Harry, a licensed pilot, takes over and flies to safety.

Learning that the enemy agents are holed up in an old warehouse where scientists including Colonel Barton is held, Billy and Harry try to free Barton, who has a secret formula for an explosive. Managing to send a message out from a radio room, the boys are saved when FBI agents overrun the warehouse. Billy is finally reunited with his father, and becomes a full-fledged member of the Junior G-Men.

Chapter titles
 Enemies Within
 The Blast of Doom
 Human Dynamite
 Blazing Danger
 Trapped by Traitors
 Traitors' Treachery
 Flaming Death
 Hurled Through Space
 The Plunge of Peril
 The Toll of Treason
 Descending Doom
 The Power of Patriotism
Source:

Cast

 Billy Halop as Billy Barton
 Huntz Hall as Gyp
 Gabriel Dell as Terry
 Bernard Punsly as Lug
 Ken Lundy as Buck
 Kenneth Howell as Harry Trent
 Roger Daniels as Midge
 Phillip Terry as Jim Bradford
 Russell Hicks as Colonel Robert Barton
 Cy Kendall as Brand
 Ben Taggart as Captain Severn
 Victor Zimmerman as Al Corey, a thug
 Edgar Edwards as Henchman Evans
 Gene Rizzi as Henchman Foster
 Florence Halop as Mary

Production
To bring the Junior G-Men to life on the big screen, Universal Studios enlisted the Dead End Kids, a group of on-screen young street toughs that later became known as The Bowery Boys. The Little Tough Guys were combined with the earlier group. The Dead End Kids appear above the title in two serials that were made: Junior G-Men (1940) and Junior G-Men of the Air (1942).

Stunts
 David Sharpe doubled Billy Halop as Billy Barton.

Reception
Reviewer Jerry Blake in The Files of Jerry Blake described as both pro-typical and, at the same time, conventional as a "chapterplay", " 'Junior G-Men' contains much more action than some of its Universal contemporaries; fistfights and chases figure prominently in most episodes, and give the serial a pleasantly fast-paced feel. Stuntmen Dave Sharpe (who doubles Billy Halop) and Ken Terrell inject plenty of energetic leaps and flips into the fistfights, while cinematographer Jerome Ash and directors Ford Beebe and John Rawlins film the chase sequences in fluid and exciting style."

See also
 Junior G-Men of the Air

References

Notes

Citations

Bibliography

 Cline, William C. "Filmography"., In the Nick of Time. Jefferson, North Carolina: McFarland & Company, Inc., 1984, .
 Powers, Richard Gid. G-Men: Hoover's FBI in American Popular Culture. Carbondale, Illinois: Southern Illinois University Press, 1983. .
 Rainey, Buck. Serials and Series: A World Filmography, 1912–1956. Jefferson, North Carolina: McFarland & Company, Inc., 2010. . 
 Rosten, Leo. Hollywood The Movie Colony, The Movie Makers. New York: Harcourt, Brace and Co., 1941. .
 Weiss, Ken and Ed Goodgold. To be Continued ...: A Complete Guide to Motion Picture Serials. New York: Bonanza Books, 1973. .

External links
 
 
 

1940 films
1940s crime films
American black-and-white films
1940s English-language films
Universal Pictures film serials
Films directed by Ford Beebe
Films directed by John Rawlins
American crime films
Films with screenplays by George H. Plympton
Films about the Federal Bureau of Investigation
1940s American films